Chris Campanioni is a first-generation American writer and the son of exiles from Cuba and Poland. He was born in Manhattan and raised in New Jersey, studied English literature and journalism at Lehigh University, and graduated from the MA program at Fordham University. He is the editor and publisher of PANK and PANK Books, and a lecturer of Latinx literature, journalism, media studies, and creative writing at Baruch College, John Jay College of Criminal Justice, and Pace University, while serving on faculty at Yale University's Yale Writers' Workshop and the Hudson Valley Writers' Center. He is the recipient of the Academy of American Poets Prize (2013) and the International Latino Book Award (2014). From 2014–2016, along with Puerto Rican novelist Jonathan Marcantoni, he ran the YouNiversity, a non-profit digital workshop that provided students access to and experience with the publishing industry through media professionals in the United States, Europe, Latin America, and Africa. Unlike the curriculum and objectives of many MFA programs across the United States, the YouNiversity focused on several different facets of a writer's literary development, including real-time interaction with editors, literary agents, graphic artists, publishers, and other readers and writers.

Style and influence 
Campanioni's fiction is affiliated with the Latin American neo-Surrealists along with Brion Gysin and his cut-up technique. While also influenced by the historic avant-garde (Dada, et al.), the coterie that haunts his first trilogy of novels is the Situationist International.

Reactions 
His book-length notebook A and B and Also Nothing (Otis Books | Seismicity Editions, 2020) was celebrated by BOMB as "a brilliant manifesto-aria on what it means to attend, to concentrate, to listen, to resist, and to reckon."

Technoculture praised his hybrid collection the Internet is for real (C&R Press, 2019) as "an autobiography in and of assemblage," Harvard Review called it "a threshold book," and Hobart described it as "a much-needed treatise on 'post-Internet' culture."

His hybrid nonfiction/poetry book Death of Art (C&R Press, 2016) was celebrated as "bringing surprise and joy back to Conceptual writing" and "a striking amalgamation of memoir and social critique, poetry and cultural theory."

Minor Literature[s] 2015 review of Campanioni's recent work focused on his parents' immigrant past and his own dislocated present, asserting that his poetry had found ways to re-evaluate technology as a conduit for connection and learning, especially linguistically.

The New York Post named Going Down one of its "must-read books" of the month in October 2013. Going Down has been lauded by various media, including the Manhattan Times, for its realistic portrayal of the newsroom and the fashion industry from the Latino perspective. The novel has also garnered criticism for its dark tone and confusing meta-fiction writing style.

In the spring of 2013, Campanioni was awarded the Academy of American Poets College Prize. From Susan L. Miller and the Academy of American Poets committee:

"Campanioni immediately draws the reader in with a sharp sensibility for the music of language. 'Forty faces, one line' demonstrates an aptitude for poetic structure as well as a contemporary sense of rhyme, and 'Billboards' focuses first in a prose-poem, then in quatrains, on the contrast between the self commodified and the loneliness of the soul inside of the commodified body. By focusing outside and inside the self in refreshing ways, Campanioni offers us meditations on 'body and soul' that include the elegant woman who’s dropped her dentures as well as the child yearning to eat cake. The poem 'Endnotes for Life' takes familiar territory (the story of Lot’s wife, the story of Orpheus and Eurydice, and the personal narrative) and makes a structure for it that calls into question the primacy of narrative in much American poetry. These sharp views of the human theater force us to examine our place in it, and to question what more exists in our own internal worlds."

His poetry, fiction, and nonfiction has been published in American Poetry Review, Fence, Diacritics, 3:AM Magazine, Evergreen Review, Journal of Cinema and Media Studies, The Brooklyn Rail, Word Riot, Numéro Cinq, Poets & Writers, Notre Dame Review, Los Angeles Review of Books, Ambit, Gorse, RHINO, Gulf Coast (magazine), Prelude, and elsewhere. As an actor, he has also appeared on “The Today Show,” “The View,” and in various speaking roles on “All My Children” and “One Life to Live,” in addition to commercials ranging from Dentyne Ice to Axe body spray, Ab Roller Evolution and Rocking Abs. He has been photographed for international magazines, books, and catalogues spanning Rio and Milan, Paris and Melbourne, including the cover of DNA. He is most known for his work with C-IN2, a campaign he has shot since June 2007, as well as his work with Levi's, Tommy Hilfiger, and Izod.

Multimedia Work 
In collaboration with designer Ab[Screenwear] and director Nadia Bedzhanova, the adaptation of Campanioni's poem "This body's long (& I'm still loading)" was in the official selection of the Canadian International Film Festival in 2017.

In the month leading to the novel's 2013 release, Campanioni created an interactive video calendar featuring film adaptations from various scenes in Going Down. The calendar reevaluates the notion of "real time" and also broadens the ways in which readers can respond to and read a text. RealClear's December 2013 feature ("The Model Writer") compared Campanioni's work to Andy Warhol's faux documentarian style and French New Wave cinema.

References

American writers of Cuban descent
American people of Polish descent
American male novelists
American male poets
Male models from New York (state)
Living people
1985 births
21st-century American poets
21st-century American male writers